Vasileios Demetis (born May 12, 1983 in Athens, Greece) is an Olympic swimmer from Greece.

Career
Demetis swam for Greece at the 2008 Olympics and at the 2007 World Championships.

References

1983 births
Living people
Greek male swimmers
Male medley swimmers
Olympic swimmers of Greece
Swimmers at the 2008 Summer Olympics
Swimmers from Athens